Queiroz may refer to:
 Queiroz, São Paulo, a municipality in the state of São Paulo in Brazil
 Queiroz (surname)
 Queiroz (Brazilian footballer)